The 2017 Latvian Football Cup was the 23rd version of the tournament. This version of the competition began on 28 May 2017 and ended on 18 October 2017. The winners of this season's cup earned a place in the first qualifying round of the 2018–19 Europa League.

In a change from recent seasons, the tournament was played in one calendar year instead of over two years. The tournament was played in its entirety in 2017

Ventspils were the defending champions.

Format
The Latvian Football Cup this season was a single elimination tournament between 52 teams. Matches which were level after regulation went to extra time and afterwards to penalties, when needed, to determine the winning club.

First round
Twelve first round matches were played from 28 May to 11 June 2017. The draw for the first round was held 24 May 2017. SK Super Nova withdrew from the tournament.

|-
!colspan="3" align="center"|28 May

|-
!colspan="3" align="center"|31 May

|-
!colspan="3" align="center"|2 June

|-
!colspan="3" align="center"|3 June

|-
!colspan="3" align="center"|4 June

|-
!colspan="3" align="center"|5 June

|-
!colspan="3" align="center"|11 June

|}

Second round
Sixteen second round matches were played from 10 to 26 June 2017. The draw for the second, third, and fourth rounds was held 6 June 2017. FK Auda, FK Smiltene/BJSS, JDFS Alberts, and FK Tukums 2000/TSS withdrew from the competition. SK Upesciems also withdrew.

|-
!colspan="3" align="center"|10 June

|-
!colspan="3" align="center"|11 June

|-
!colspan="3" align="center"|18 June

|-
!colspan="3" align="center"|19 June

|-
!colspan="3" align="center"|20 June

|-
!colspan="3" align="center"|22 June

|-
!colspan="3" align="center"|25 June

|-
!colspan="3" align="center"|26 June

|}

Third round
Eight third round matches were played on 1 and 2 July 2017. The draw for the second, third, and fourth rounds was held 6 June 2017. FK Staiceles Bebri withdrew from the tournament.

|-
!colspan="3" align="center"|1 July

|-
!colspan="3" align="center"|2 July

|}

Fourth round
Eight fourth round matches were played from 7 to 10 July 2017. The draw for the second, third, and fourth rounds was held 6 June 2017. Babīte were excluded from the tournament.

|-
!colspan="3" align="center"|7 July

|-
!colspan="3" align="center"|8 July

|-
!colspan="3" align="center"|9 July

|-
!colspan="3" align="center"|10 July

|}

Quarter–finals
Four quarter–final matches were played from 16 August to 13 September 2017. The draw was held 18 July 2017.

|}

Semi–finals
Two semi–final matches were played on 20 September 2017. The draw was held 18 July 2017.

|}

Final
The cup final was played on 18 October 2017.

See also
2017 Latvian Higher League

References

External links 
 LFF.lv
 uefa.com

Latvian Football Cup seasons
Latvian Football Cup
2017 in Latvian football